Tsoying Senior High School (TYHS) is a senior high school in Zuoying District, Kaohsiung, Taiwan.

Lin Hwai-min established the Tsoying Dance Division In 1984. The division has studies for Chinese opera and for Western styles of dance, including ballet and modern dance.

References
 Gerdes, Ellen. "ECLECTIC LESSONS FROM TAIWAN: HARD - WORKING DANCERS AT TSOYING HIGH SCHOOL (Archive). Journal of Emerging Dance Scholarship. World Dance Alliance. July 2013.

Notes

Further reading
 Gerdes, Ellen. "The Role of Technique in Dance Education: The Example of Tsoying High School, Taiwan." Congress on Research in Dance Conference Proceedings, Congress on Research in Dance Conference Proceedings / Volume 41 / Supplement S1 / January 2009, pp 216–227. DOI: 10.1017/S2049125500001138, Published online 4 January 2013.

External links

 Tsoying Senior High School
 Tsoying Senior High School 
 Tsoying Senior High School (Archive)

High schools in Taiwan
Schools in Kaohsiung
Zuoying District